Shellmound is an unincorporated community located in Leflore County, Mississippi, United States, located approximately  north of Greenwood and approximately  southeast of Schlater near U.S. Highway 49E.

It is part of the Greenwood, Mississippi micropolitan area.

History
Shellmound is named for a nearby mound that had a large amount of shells on the surface. The area was possibly the site of a battle between the Chakchiuma and allied Choctaw and Chickasaw.
Shellmound was founded as a landing on the Tallahatchie River and was one of the earliest settlements on the Tallahatchie. The community served as a distribution point for the area between the river and McNutt. In the late 1800s, Shellmound had four general stores, a doctor, and a population of 150.

A post office operated under the name Shellmound from 1854 to 1921.

Music
Shellmound is home to one of Leflore County's seven Mississippi Blues Trail markers (at Racetrack Plantation).

Gallery

References

Unincorporated communities in Leflore County, Mississippi
Unincorporated communities in Mississippi
Greenwood, Mississippi micropolitan area